Dr. Lorna Scott McBarnette (June 13, 1939 - March 17, 2009) was the Acting Commissioner of the New York State Department of Health from February 25, 1991 until June 9, 1992 (and eight years as deputy executive commissioner), dean of the School of Health Technology and Management at the State University at Stony Brook and Vice President for Institutional Development and Vice Provost for Health Professions at the American University of Antigua School of Nursing.

Education
McBarnette earned a Bachelor of Arts degree from the College at Old Westbury, a Master of Science in Health Policy and Management from Harvard University, a Doctor of Education from LaSalle University, a Doctor of Science from American International School of Medicine and received a Certificate in Public Administration from Long Island University, C.W. Post College. She also earned a Ph.D. in public administration from the State University at Albany.

References

External links
IN THE MATTER OF MARGARET HAMBURG, AS ACTING COMMISSIONER OF THE NEW YORK CITY DEPARTMENT OF HEALTH, ET AL. v. LORNA MCBARNETTE, AS ACTING COMMISSIONER OF THE NEW YORK STATE DEPARTMENT OF HEALTH, ET AL.,

State University of New York at Old Westbury alumni
La Salle University alumni
Long Island University alumni
University at Albany, SUNY alumni
Harvard School of Public Health alumni
Stony Brook University faculty
1939 births
2009 deaths
Commissioners of Health of the State of New York
American university and college faculty deans
Women deans (academic)
20th-century American academics